Definitely Maybe is the debut studio album by English rock band Oasis, released by Creation Records on 29 August 1994. Oasis booked Monnow Valley Studio near Rockfield in late 1993 to record the album and worked with producer Dave Batchelor, whom band member Noel Gallagher knew from his days working as a roadie for the Inspiral Carpets, though sessions were unsatisfactory and Batchelor was subsequently fired. It is the only studio album to feature all five original members, as founding member drummer Tony McCarroll was sacked from the band in 1995.

In January 1994, the group set about re-recording the album at Sawmills Studio in Cornwall, where sessions were produced by Noel alongside Mark Coyle. The results were still deemed unsatisfactory; in desperation, Creation's Marcus Russell contacted engineer and producer Owen Morris, who eventually worked on mastering the album at Johnny Marr's studio in Manchester.

Definitely Maybe was an immediate commercial and critical success in the United Kingdom, having followed on the heels of the singles "Supersonic", "Shakermaker", and the UK top-ten hit "Live Forever", which was also a success on US Rock Airplay. The album went on to sell over 8.5 million copies worldwide and brought widespread critical acclaim. It went straight to number one in the UK Albums Chart and became the fastest-selling debut album in the UK at the time; it went on to be certified 8× platinum by the BPI for sales of over 2.4 million units. It also was successful in the United States, being certified platinum.

The album helped to spur a revitalisation in British pop music in the 1990s, and was embraced by critics for its optimistic themes and rejection of the negative outlook of the grunge music of the time. The album is regarded as a seminal entry of the Britpop scene, and has appeared in many publications' lists of the greatest albums of all time. In 2006, the NME conducted a readers' poll in which Definitely Maybe was voted the greatest album of all time. In 2015, Spin included the album in their list of "The 300 Best Albums of 1985–2014". Rolling Stone ranked the album at No. 217 on its 2020 list of the 500 Greatest Albums of All Time.

Background and recording
Formerly called the Rain, Oasis were formed in 1991 by Liam Gallagher, Paul "Bonehead" Arthurs, Paul "Guigsy" McGuigan, and Tony McCarroll. The group were soon joined by Liam's older brother Noel, who insisted that the group would give him complete control and work towards global fame if he joined.

Oasis booked Monnow Valley Studio near Rockfield in late 1993 to record the album. Their producer was Dave Batchelor, whom Noel knew from his days working as a roadie for the Inspiral Carpets. The sessions were unsatisfactory and Bonehead recalled, "It wasn't happening. [Batchelor] was the wrong person for the job... we'd play in this great big room, buzzing to be in this studio, playing like we always played. He'd say, 'Come in and have a listen.' And we'd be like, 'That doesn't sound like it sounded in that room. What's that?' It was thin. Weak. Too clean."

Additionally, engineer Dave Scott commented, "I couldn’t connect with him [Batchelor] artistically or technically, neither could I get any idea from him what his vision for the album was. This made life very difficult for me. I had rarely worked under other producers and when I had, there had always been a collaboration. I think that the lack of direction and different expectations led to an uncoordinated session with too many compromises." He described various technical issues that befell the sessions, including defective equipment, poor quality headphones, and excessive sound variation between mixing channels. He was fired by Batchelor after two clashes while recording "Slide Away", and was later informed "Slide Away" was the only track kept from the sessions.

The sessions at Monnow Valley were costing £800 a day. As the sessions proved increasingly fruitless, the group began to panic. Bonehead said, "Noel was frantically on the phone to the management, going, 'This ain't working.' For it not to be happening was a bit frightening." Batchelor was fired, and Noel tried to make use of the music already recorded by taking the tapes to a number of London studios. Tim Abbot of Creation Records said while visiting the band in Chiswick, "McGee, Noel, me, and various people had a great sesh [session], and we listened to it over and over again. And all I could think was, 'It ain't got the attack.' There was no immediacy."

In January 1994, the group returned from an ill-fated trip to Amsterdam and set about re-recording the album at Sawmills Studio in Cornwall. This time the sessions were produced by Noel alongside Mark Coyle. The group decided the only way to replicate their live sound in the studio was to record together without soundproofing between individual instrument, with Noel overdubbing numerous guitars afterwards. Bonehead said, "That was Noel's favourite trick: get the drums, bass, and rhythm guitar down, and then he'd cane it. 'Less is more' didn't really work then." The results were still deemed unsatisfactory, and there was little chance of another attempt at recording the album, so the recordings already made had to be used.

In desperation, Creation's Marcus Russell contacted engineer and producer Owen Morris, who had previously mixed the album's songs. Morris recalled after hearing the Sawmills recordings, "I just thought, 'They've messed up here.' I guessed at that stage Noel was completely fucked off. Marcus was like, 'You can do what you like – literally, whatever you want.'" Among Morris's first tasks was to strip away the layers of guitar overdubs Noel had added, although he noted that the overdubs allowed him to construct the musical dynamics of songs such as "Columbia" and "Rock 'n' Roll Star".

Morris worked on mastering the album at Johnny Marr's studio in Manchester. He recalled that Marr was "appalled by how 'in your face' the whole thing was" and would question Morris's mixing choices, such as leaving the background noise at the beginning of "Cigarettes & Alcohol". Inspired by Phil Spector's use of tape delay on the drums of John Lennon's song "Instant Karma!" and Tony Visconti's use of the Eventide Harmonizer on the drums of David Bowie's album Low, Morris added eighth-note tape delays on the drums, which lent additional groove to McCarroll's basic beats. Tape delay was employed to double the drums of "Columbia", giving the song a faster rhythm, and tambourines were programmed on several songs to follow McCarroll's snare hits.

Morris also used a technique he had learned from Bernard Sumner while recording the self-titled album by Sumner's group Electronic, routing the bass guitar through a Minimoog and using the filters to remove the high-end, which he used to hide imprecise playing, and heavily compressed the final mix to an extent he admitted was "more than would normally be considered 'professional.

Morris completed his final mix of the record on the vintage Neve console during the bank holiday weekend in May in Studio 5 at Matrix Recording Studios in London's Fulham district. Music journalist John Harris noted, "The miracle was that music that had passed through so many hands sounded so dynamic: the guitar-heavy stew that Morris had inherited had been remoulded into something positively pile-driving."

On the other hand, engineer Anjali Dutt criticised the abrasive mastering: "Though I don’t think that the original mixes were amazing, I did prefer them to the final album, as the relentlessness of the compressed chainsaw guitars just wears you out even if the initial feeling of excitement is invigorating. [...] I think his mixes did the job and gave it that much needed excitement and attitude. But it wasn't my kind of sound and found it far too abrasive so I can only recall ever playing a few tracks at a time."

Cover art 
The photograph on the front cover of the album was taken by rock photographer Michael Spencer Jones in guitarist Bonehead's house. The image was inspired by the back cover of the Beatles' 1966 compilation LP A Collection of Beatles Oldies, and, in the positioning of Liam on the floor, by a visit Spencer Jones had made to the Egyptology section at Manchester Science Museum. In a 2019 interview, Spencer Jones said that the idea to photograph the band at Bonehead's house came from Noel, who originally wanted the band to be seated around Bonehead's dining table; Spencer Jones instead suggested shooting in the lounge, facing a bay window. He also said that he asked Liam to lie on the floor to draw attention away from the room's wood flooring, which he felt would make the picture look like an advert for varnish. The wine glass to Liam's right was filled with diluted Ribena; although an urban legend suggests that this was used because the band could not afford wine, Spencer Jones explained that it was actually because red wine often turns out black instead of red on pictures. 

Spencer Jones asked the band to bring objects of personal value to them to the shoot. The television is showing a scene with actors Eli Wallach and Antonio Casale from Sergio Leone's film The Good, the Bad and the Ugly. A still of actor Gian Maria Volonté from another Leone film, A Fistful of Dollars, is visible on the television on the back cover. According to Spencer Jones, this was Noel's favourite film. A picture of footballer Rodney Marsh playing for Manchester City (the football team of the Gallaghers and McGuigan) is propped against the fireplace. A photograph of footballer George Best can be seen in the window at the behest of Bonehead, a Manchester United fan. A poster (actually the inside of a gatefold sleeve) of Burt Bacharach, one of Noel's idols, is also shown leaning against the side of the sofa on the lower left-hand side of the cover. Bonehead's Epiphone Riviera, which he used on every Oasis recording and gig during his tenure in the band, is propped against the wall. Some writers believe that Oasis were trying to pay homage to the album cover of Pink Floyd's Ummagumma album by placing Bacharach's picture in the same prominent position used for the soundtrack of Vincente Minnelli's film Gigi on Ummagumma.

Release and promotion 
Oasis signed to independent record label Creation Records in 1993. The limited-edition 12" single "Columbia" was released later that year as a teaser for journalists and radio shows, and was unexpectedly picked up by BBC Radio 1, who played it 19 times in the two weeks after its release. The band's first commercial single "Supersonic" was released on 11 April 1994. The following week, it debuted at No. 31 on the British singles chart. The song was followed by "Shakermaker" in June 1994, which debuted at No. 11 and earned the group an appearance on Top of the Pops.

The release of Definitely Maybe was preceded by a third single, "Live Forever", which was released on 8 August 1994 and became the group's first top ten single. The continuing success of Oasis partially allowed Creation to ride out a period of tough financial straits; the label was still £2 million in debt, so Tim Abbot was given only £60,000 to promote the upcoming album. Abbot tried to determine how to best use his small budget: "I'd go back to the Midlands every couple of weeks and people I knew would say, 'Oasis are great. This is what we listen to.' And I'd be thinking, "Well, you lot don't buy singles. You don't read the NME. You don't read Q. How do we get the people to like you?'" Abbot decided to place ads in publications that had never been approached by Creation before, such as football magazines, match programmes, and UK dance music periodicals. His suspicions that Oasis would appeal to these non-traditional audiences were confirmed when the dance music magazine Mixmag, which usually ignored guitar-based music, gave Definitely Maybe a five-star review.

Definitely Maybe was released on 29 August 1994. The album sold 100,000 copies in its first four days. On 4 September, the album debuted at No. 1 on the British charts. It outsold the second-highest album (The Three Tenors in Concert 1994, which had been favoured to be the chart-topper that week), by a factor of 50%. The first-week sales earned Definitely Maybe the record of the fastest-selling debut album in British history. "Cigarettes & Alcohol" was released as the fourth single from the album in October, peaking at No. 7 in the UK, which was then a career high for the band. Noel said "Slide Away" was considered as a fifth single but he ultimately refused, arguing, "You can't have five [singles] off a debut album."

Critical reception 

Definitely Maybe received widespread critical acclaim and was a commercial success, with many critics and listeners welcoming the album's fearless optimism, particularly in an era of rock which was dominated by American grunge which seemed at odds with the album. Noel's songwriting and melodic skills, along with Liam's vocals, received particular praise. Keith Cameron of NME called Noel "a pop craftsman in the classic tradition and a master of his trade" and believed that "the only equivocal thing about Definitely Maybe is its title [...] everything else screams certainty [...] the fact is that too much heartfelt emotion, ingenious belief and patent songwriting savvy rushes through the debut Oasis album for it to be the work of a bunch of wind-up merchants [...] it's like opening your bedroom curtains one morning and discovering that some f—er's built the Taj Mahal in your back garden and then filled it with your favourite flavour of Angel Delight". Melody Maker gave the album its star rating signifying a "bloody essential" purchase, and its critic Paul Lester said, "Of all the great new British pop groups, Oasis are the least playful, the least concerned with post-modern sleights of influence [...] Definitely Maybe is 'What the World's Been Waiting For', a record full of songs to live to, made by a gang of reckless northern reprobates who you can easily dream of joining [...] If you don't agree it offers a dozen opportunities to believe that 1994 is the best year ever for pop/rock music, then you're wrong".

Stuart Maconie of Q described Definitely Maybe as "an outrageously exciting rock/pop album... a rutting mess of glam, punk, and psychedelia, you've heard it all before of course, but not since the Stone Roses debut have a young Lancastrian [sic] group carried themselves with such vigour and insouciance". Voxs Mike Pattenden stated that "occasionally – and in this voracious, selfish, faddish industry it is only occasionally – something materialises that justifies the endless bullshit that represents its daily diet... the 11 songs that make up Definitely Maybe [...] lie shining like so much crystal-cut glass among the debris of the nation's hotel rooms". Writing in Mojo in 1994, Jim Irvin felt the record was "bloody close" to the "punch-yer-lights-out debut they'd intended. Certainly when put next to the flimsy, uncommitted music of most new British bands, Definitely Maybe spits feathers... Spunky, adolescent rock, vivifying and addictive".

In the US, Rolling Stone included the album in its end-of-year round-up of 1994's most important records, with Paul Evans saying, "Liam Gallagher has God-given cool. And with his brother Noel supplying him with sumptuous rockers, it's easy to see why this quintet is next year's model. Heavier on guitar than Blur or Suede, they're the simpler, catchier outfit." Neil Strauss of The New York Times wrote of the songs; "On its own, each one sounds like a classic, rippling with hard guitar hooks, strong dance beats and memorable choruses."

Legacy 

In 1997, Definitely Maybe was named the 14th greatest album of all time in a "Music of the Millennium" poll conducted by HMV, Channel 4, The Guardian, and Classic FM. On Channel 4's "100 Greatest Albums" countdown in 2005, the album was placed at No. 6. In 2006, NME placed the album at No. 3 on its list of the greatest British albums ever, behind the Stone Roses' self-titled debut album and the Smiths' The Queen Is Dead. In a 2006 British poll run by NME and the Guinness Book of British Hit Singles, the album was voted the best album of all time, with the Beatles' Sgt. Pepper's Lonely Hearts Club Band finishing second. Q placed it at No. 5 on its greatest albums of all time list in 2006, and NME hailed it as the greatest album of all time that same year.

In a 2008 poll conducted by Q and HMV of the greatest British albums of all time, Definitely Maybe placed at No. 1. Rolling Stone ranked the album at No. 217 on its 2020 list of the "500 Greatest Albums of All Time", No. 78 on its 2011 list of the "100 Best Albums of the Nineties", as well as No. 42 on its 2013 list of the "100 Best Debut Albums of All Time". The German edition of Rolling Stone ranked the album at No. 156 on its list of "The 500 Greatest Albums of All Time". At Acclaimed Music, a website which calculates the most favourably reviewed songs and albums, Definitely Maybe is ranked as the 15th most critically acclaimed album of the 1990s and the 111th most critically acclaimed album of all time.

In 2000, the album was voted No. 44 in Colin Larkin's All Time Top 1000 Albums. In July 2014, Guitar World ranked Definitely Maybe at No. 19 on its list of "50 Iconic Albums That Defined 1994". The album was ranked at No. 160 on Spins "300 Best Albums of the Past 30 Years (1985–2014)" list. In 2017, Pitchfork listed the album at No. 9 on its list of the "50 Best Britpop Albums". On the other hand, it was ranked at No. 4 on the list of most overrated albums ever in a 2005 BBC public poll. The album was also included in the book 1001 Albums You Must Hear Before You Die.

Reviewing the 2014 reissue of Definitely Maybe in Mojo, Danny Eccleston stated, "There's nothing more exhilarating than the feeling that something great is about to happen. It's a force that courses, unmanageably, through Oasis' debut album even today... This is transcendental rock'n'roll music that celebrates the moment, not a moment." In his review of the reissue, Rolling Stone critic Rob Sheffield said, "Twenty years on, Oasis' debut album remains one of the most gloriously loutish odes to cigarettes, alcohol, and dumb guitar solos that the British Isles have ever coughed up." The same year, a study of the album by writer Alex Niven was published in Bloomsbury's 33⅓ series. Niven reviewed the album from a sociopolitical context of Oasis as a working-class answer to four decades of political strife.

Track listing 

Bonus tracks

Vinyl version

Singles box set 

The Definitely Maybe box set was released on 4 November 1996, featuring four discs of singles, including B-sides, and one disc of interviews. The set charted at number 23 on the UK Albums Chart.

All songs written by Noel Gallagher, except "I Am the Walrus" by Lennon–McCartney.

Chart position

2014 reissue 
As part of a promotional campaign entitled Chasing the Sun, the album was released on 19 May 2014, a deluxe edition featured the remastered original album packaged with two additional discs of material. Additionally, a limited edition reproduction of the band's original 1993 demo cassette was also made available to purchase.

DVD 
Definitely Maybe was released on DVD in September 2004 to mark the tenth anniversary of its original release. It went triple platinum in the UK. The DVD featured an hour-long documentary about the recording of the album featuring interviews with the band and its associates. Also included was the album in its entirety, at 48 kHz, including a remix of "Sad Song" with double tracked vocals during the chorus. "Sad Song" originally only appeared on the UK vinyl and Japanese CD versions of the album, as well as on a French bonus CD included with copies of the album sold at FNAC stores. Other content included live and TV performances of the album's twelve tracks, and the promo videos to "Supersonic" (UK & US versions), "Shakermaker", "Live Forever" (UK & US versions), "Cigarettes & Alcohol" and "Rock 'n' Roll Star". A limited-edition release in the UK and Ireland included a bonus DVD containing more live footage and anecdotes.

There was also an accompanying made-for-TV documentary, entitled There We Were, Now Here We Are ... : The Making Of Oasis. This was broadcast on Channel 4 in the UK at 11:30 pm on Friday, 3 September, three days before the release of the Definitely Maybe DVD. The programme combined existing and unused interview footage from the DVD documentary and focused on the origins of the band, and the four singles from Definitely Maybe. It also included a clip of "All Around the World" performed live at a rehearsal session in the Boardwalk in 1992, five years before it was eventually recorded and released on Be Here Now. The DVD received the NME award for Best Music DVD. The DVD earned Gold status in Australia.

Personnel 

Oasis
 Liam Gallagher – vocals, tambourine, production
 Noel Gallagher – lead guitar, bass guitar, backing vocals, production
 Paul "Bonehead" Arthurs – rhythm guitar, piano on "Live Forever" and "Digsy's Dinner", production
 Paul "Guigsy" McGuigan – bass guitar, production
 Tony McCarroll – drums, production

Additional personnel
 Anthony Griffiths – backing vocals on "Supersonic"
 Mark Coyle – production, mixing on "Supersonic" and "Married with Children", engineering
 Owen Morris – additional production, mixing
 Barry Grint – mastering at Abbey Road Studios, London
 David Batchelor – production on "Slide Away"
 Anjali Dutt – engineering
 Dave Scott – engineering, mixing
 Roy Spong – engineering
 Brian Cannon for Microdot – sleeve concept, design, art direction
 Michael Spencer Jones – photography

Charts

Weekly charts

Year-end charts

Certifications

Definitely Maybe

Definitely Maybe DVD

References

Notes

External links 

 Definitely Maybe at YouTube (streamed copy where licensed)

1994 debut albums
Albums produced by Mark Coyle
Albums produced by Owen Morris
Creation Records albums
Epic Records albums
Oasis (band) albums
Rock albums by British artists
Albums involved in plagiarism controversies